Group B of the 2003 Fed Cup Asia/Oceania Zone Group I was one of two pools in the Asia/Oceania zone of the 2003 Fed Cup. Six teams competed in a round robin competition, with the top two teams advancing to the play-offs and the bottom team being relegated to Group II for the following year.

Indonesia vs. Chinese Taipei

Thailand vs. Uzbekistan

Malaysia vs. Kazakhstan

Indonesia vs. Kazakhstan

Chinese Taipei vs. Uzbekistan

Thailand vs. Malaysia

Indonesia vs. Thailand

Chinese Taipei vs. Kazakhstan

Uzbekistan vs. Malaysia

Indonesia vs. Uzbekistan

Chinese Taipei vs. Malaysia

Thailand vs. Kazakhstan

Indonesia vs. Malaysia

Chinese Taipei vs. Thailand

Uzbekistan vs. Kazakhstan

  failed to win any ties in the pool, and thus was relegated to Group II in 2004, where they finished first overall and thus advanced back to Group I for 2005.

See also
Fed Cup structure

References

External links
 Fed Cup website

2003 Fed Cup Asia/Oceania Zone